Halophila decipiens, commonly known as Caribbean seagrass or paddle grass, is a seagrass in the family Hydrocharitaceae. It grows underwater on sandy or muddy sea floors in shallow parts of tropical seas.

Description
Halophila is the only genus of seagrass that lacks basal sheaths on the leaf stems. Halophila decipiens has thin rhizomes that run along near the surface of sand or mud, with a root at each node to anchor the plant in place. The almost stemless leaves grow in pairs from the nodes with a pair of scales at their base. Male and female flowers are found on the same spathe and a female flower can produce about 30 seeds. Flowering seems to be stimulated by a rise in water temperature above a certain threshold rather than day length. The plant is an annual.

Distribution
Halophila decipiens is a pantropical species being found in tropical regions of the Indian and Pacific Oceans, the Western Atlantic Ocean and European waters. It is a euryhaline species and can be found in areas with low salinity.

Ecology
Seagrass beds acts as a source of food, a breeding ground and a habitat for various flora and fauna. In the Indian River Lagoon, Halophila decipiens is one of three species of Halophila, the others being Halophila johnsonii and Halophila engelmannii. Halophila baillonis has also been reported but may have been misidentified and several other species of seagrass are also present. These seagrasses often form mixed meadows and the animals that feed on them include sea urchins, sea turtles, parrotfish, surgeonfish and possibly pinfish.

References

decipiens
Pantropical flora